Sealdah railway division is one of the four railway divisions under the Eastern Railway zone of the Indian Railways. It's headquarters are located in Kaiser Street in Kolkata, West Bengal near the Sealdah railway station. Geographically the division covers the railway tracks and services in the areas between the Hooghly river on the west, Bangladesh on the north and east and the Sundarbans in the south.

Services 
The division primarily serves five major districts of the state of West Bengal in India, namely the Kolkata, North 24 Parganas, South 24 Parganas, Nadia and Murshidabad districts. The division forms the eastern part of the Kolkata Suburban Railway with numerous daily EMU services connecting Kolkata with the suburban areas of the five districts. The Sealdah railway station handles 124 mail/express trains connecting it to various parts of India along with 34 passenger trains & 921 suburban EMU train services, daily, while the Kolkata railway station handles 72 mail/express trains connecting it to various parts of India along with 4 passenger trains & 31 suburban EMU train services, daily. Kolkata terminal also acts as an international passenger terminal for trains destined to Bangladesh namely the Maitree Express and Bandhan Express services. Being located in the central business district of Kolkata, the Sealdah station plays a vital role in the management of suburban railway traffic. Suburban services are also provided to the Hooghly and Howrah districts via the Naihati–Bandel branch line and the Calcutta Chord link line.

Kolkata, Barrackpore, Diamond Harbour, Dakshineswar, Krishnanagar, Nabadwip Ghat, Murshidabad, Plassey, Shantipur, Sagar Island and the Sundarbans are some of the major tourist and pilgrimage spots served by the division.

The division handles international freight and passenger traffic with Bangladesh through the Gede and Petrapole stations. The major commodities loaded from this division are containers, gunny bales, coal and fertilizers. Gunny bales are loaded from Titagarh and Naihati, while containers are loaded from Container Corporation of India sidings at Kolkata Dock, Kidderpore Dock and Cossipore Container Rail Terminal whereas coal and fertilizers are loaded from Kidderpore Dock.  An average 121 numbers of Freight wagons are interchanged daily wise in average via Gede and Petrapole interchanging points with for the financial year 2019-20 with Bangladesh Railway as well. The major commodities received by this division are cement, fertilizers, food grains, containers, POL and coal for thermal power plants. The division also has 15 good sheds and 15 industrial sidings by which average interchange of this division is 28.21 rakes per day.

Routes 
The division is divided into 2 sections namely the Sealdah Main and North section and the Sealdah South section. The Sealdah Main section handles long distance trains to the rest of India while the Sealdah North section is a suburban section primarily serving the Northern districts of North 24 Parganas, Nadia and Murshidabad. The Sealdah South section is completely a suburban section connecting the Kolkata district with the numerous towns and villages of the South 24 Paraganas district and the Sundarbans. Both the sections are connected with each other via the Kolkata Circular Railway.

The following routes fall under the jurisdiction of the division:

 Sealdah Main and North section
 Sealdah–Ranaghat–Gede line
 Naihati–Bandel branch line ( railway station only)
 Calcutta Chord link line (upto  railway station)
 Ranaghat–Krishnanagar City–Lalgola line
 Shantipur loop line
 Krishnanagar City–Nabadwip Ghat line (under conversion to broad-gauge and extension)
 Sealdah–Bangaon line
 Barasat–Hasnabad branch line
 Ranaghat–Bangaon branch line
Sealdah South section
 Sealdah–Diamond Harbour line
 Budge Budge branch line
 Canning branch line
 Namkhana branch line
Kolkata Circular Railway

History 
The Eastern Bengal Railway  company was formed in 1857 for the construction and working of a line from Calcutta to Dacca, with a branch to Jessore. The company also acquired a steam vessel service operating between Kushtia and Dacca on the Padma river. With the successful construction and opening of the Hardinge Bridge in 1915 and gauge conversion of the Santahar–Parbatipur–Siliguri line from 1924 to 1926, the Calcutta–Siliguri broad gauge line was completed and became the main line of the Eastern section of EBR. 

The Bengal Central Railway  company constructed two broad gauge lines: one connecting Ranaghat and Bangaon in 1882 and the other connecting Dum Dum with Khulna (now in Bangladesh), via Bangaon which opened in stages and was completed in 1884. These lines were merged with Eastern Bengal Railway in 1904, with the Sealdah–Bangaon–Jessore–Khulna line becoming the main line of the Central section of EBR.

This line was amalgamated with EBR on 1 July 1904. EBR further extended the line from Krishnanagar to Nabadwip Ghat and opened the line for traffic from 30 June 1926. In 1925 an alternate  broad gauge line was built from Kalinarayanpur (Churni Bridge) to Shantipur and the old  gauge line between Shantipur and Aistola Ghat was abandoned.

It was further extended via Taki to Hasnabad (Chingrighata) in 1909. This was further extended to Belgachia in 1914 and was known as the Shyambazar Branch.

In 1868, CSER having suffered extensive losses due to floods and other problems, sold the line to the Indian government (management then being leased to the Eastern Bengal Railway) and the company was dissolved in March 1870. Thus the line became a part of the Southern Section of the Eastern Bengal Railway.

The Budge Budge branch line was initially sanctioned in 1886 as a line to connect  with the Kidderpore Docks. The Calcutta Ports Commissioner's Railway  built a branch line from Kidderpore Docks to Majerhat on 1893.

In 1942, EBR was merged with the Assam Bengal Railway  to form the Bengal and Assam Railway .

Post the partition of India in 1947, the Eastern and Central sections of EBR were divided between India and East Pakistan. The direct connection between South Bengal and North Bengal was affected as the Calcutta–Siliguri line was snapped resulting in Haldibari–Chilahati and Gede–Darsana becoming international transit points for trains. In the Central section, Petrapole railway station was created as the terminus on the Indian side while the Benapole railway station became the terminus in the East Pakistani side of the line. All the railway lines east of Hooghly, south of Lalgola and west of East Pakistan that were under EBR were reorganised to be  under the Sealdah division. The Sealdah division became a part of the Eastern Railway after the reorganization of railway zones on 14 April 1952.

The Barasat–Basirhat Light Railway closed down in 1955 due to increasing losses. However a new  broad gauge line was built in a new alignment between Barasat and Hasnabad from 1957 to 1962. The Shyambazar branch line was abandoned. The line was extended up to Kulpi by 1992 and was completed till Kakdwip by 2001. The Kakdwip–Namkhana section was completed by 2004. The Baghbazar-Prinsep Ghat line was rehabilitated and commissioned for passenger traffic on 15 August 1984 and services were subsequently extended northwards towards Tala and finally to Dum Dum by 17 June 1990. The Prinsep Ghat-Majerhat elevated section was commissioned in 2005 thus completing the Circular railway line.

List of major railway stations by commercial importance 
The list includes the number of railway stations under the Sealdah railway division categorized by their commercial importance. Only major railway stations are listed.

References
 

 
Divisions of Indian Railways
1854 establishments in India